Paradeshayesites is an extinct genus of cephalopod belonging to the Ammonite subclass.

Biostratigraphic significance 
The International Commission on Stratigraphy (ICS) has assigned the First Appearance Datum of Paradeshayesites oglanlensis as the defining biological marker for the start of the Aptian Stage of the Cretaceous, ~125.0 million years ago.

References

Cretaceous ammonites
Index fossils
Aptian life